The 2018 Champion Hurdle was a horse race held at Cheltenham Racecourse on Tuesday 13 March 2018. It was the 88th running of the Champion Hurdle.

Eleven horses started the race. The winner of the race for the second year in a row was Buveur d'Air, a seven year old French-bred British-trained racehorse ridden by Barry Geraghty and trained by Nicky Henderson.

Race details
 Sponsor: Unibet
 Purse: 
 Going:  Going: Heavy, Soft in places
 Distance: 2 miles 87 yards
 Number of runners: 11
 Winner's time: 4m 05.00s

Full result

 Abbreviations: nse = nose; nk = neck; shd = short head; hd = head; dist = distance; PU = pulled up

References

External links
2018 Champion Hurdle at the Racing Post

Champion Hurdle
 2018
Champion Hurdle
2010s in Gloucestershire
Champion Hurdle